Henricus sangayanus is a species of moth belonging to the family Tortricidae. It is found in Ecuador.

The wingspan is about 24.5 mm. The head and thorax are ferruginous cream. The ground colour is yellow cream strigulated (finely streaked) with ochreous rust. Concolorous spots represent costal parts of the usual markings of the genus Henricus. The dorsum is brown with some rust scales near the posterior part of the inner edge and blackish scales at the tornus. The hindwing is cream tinged yellowish in apical part.

Etymology
The name refers to the type locality, Sangay National Park in Morona-Santiago Province.

References

Moths described in 2009
Henricus (moth)
Moths of South America
Taxa named by Józef Razowski